Zographus aulicus is a species of beetle in the family Cerambycidae. It was described by Bertoloni in 1849. It has a wide distribution in Africa.

Varietas
 Zographus aulicus var. unicolor Breuning, 1935
 Zographus aulicus var. ferox Harold, 1878

References

Sternotomini
Beetles described in 1849